The Qallupilluit (a.k.a. Qalupalik) is a mythical creature from Inuit folklore. Much like the Bogeyman, the Qallupilluit is said to kidnap misbehaving children. The legend also has a practical purpose in keeping children away from thin ice or bodies of water, as this is where the creatures are said to live. If children are found alone at the edge of the ice, the Qallupilluit is said to stuff them into its amautik (similar to a parka), before drowning them in the icy water.

As with most similar legends, there are conflicting reports as to the appearance and gender of the Qallupilluit, though they are always humanoid. Some translations use the pronoun 'he', but others describe the creature as 'she', a feminine creature who uses children to maintain "her long, flowing hair". In some tellings the creature has elongated fingernails, and green, slimy skin.

The Qallupilluit were the subject of the book A Promise Is A Promise by Robert Munsch and Michael Kusugak. It was later the subject of a children's graphic novel by Inuit artist Roselynn Akulukjuk.

References

Inuit mythology
Inuit legendary creatures
Bogeymen